Sergey Klimov (born 1935) is a Soviet sprint canoer who competed in the late 1950s. At the 1956 Summer Olympics, he finished fifth in the K-2 10000 m event.

References
Sports-reference.com profile

1935 births
Canoeists at the 1956 Summer Olympics
Living people
Olympic canoeists of the Soviet Union
Soviet male canoeists
Place of birth missing (living people)
Date of birth missing (living people)